Pejović is a surname, a patronymic of Pejo.

Notable people with the name include:

Aco Pejović (born 1972), Serbian popular pop-folk singer
Aleksandar Pejović (born 1990), Serbian professional footballer
Danilo Pejović (1928–2007), Croatian philosopher
Dragiša Pejović (born 1982), Serbian footballer
Filip Pejović (born 1982), Serbian former professional footballer
Luka Pejović (born 1985), Montenegrin international footballer
Luka Pejović (footballer, born 1994), Croatian footballer
Mitar Pejović (born 1983), Serbian football goalkeeper
Srećko Pejović (born 1953), Serbian Olympic sport shooter who competed for Yugoslavia
Vlada Pejović (born 1950), Serbian former football manager and player
Žarko Pejović (born 1986), Montenegrin handball player
Zvezdan Pejović (born 1966), Montenegrin former professional footballer

See also
Pajović
Pejaković
Pejinović
Pejčinović

Montenegrin surnames
Serbian surnames
Croatian surnames